Claxton is an L6 chondrite meteorite that fell to earth on December 10, 1984 in Georgia, United States. It is the only known meteorite to directly strike a mailbox.

Mailbox strike
The rear of the mailbox was crushed and the mailbox was knocked to the ground. A collector bought the mailbox from the homeowner and sold it to the Macovich Collection where it is valued at $60,000–$80,000.

Classification
It is an ordinary chondrite type L6 with a light grey interior containing chondrules and free iron.

See also 
 Glossary of meteoritics
 Meteorite falls
 Ordinary chondrite

References

Evans County, Georgia
Meteorites found in the United States
Geology of Georgia (U.S. state)
1984 in Georgia (U.S. state)